Hawaiian Heat is an American drama television series. It starred Robert Ginty and Jeff McCracken. The series aired on ABC from September 14 to December 21, 1984.

Overview 
It starred Robert Ginty and Jeff McCracken as two Chicago cops who quit their jobs in the Windy City to become detectives in Hawaii.  Their boss at the Honolulu Police Department was played by veteran actor Mako. Many of the episodes were directed by Ivan Dixon. The series was shot in Hawaii. Only eleven episodes aired on ABC, including the pilot movie. Its theme song, "Goodbye Blues," was used by online video producer Brad Jones as the theme for his show "80's Dan."

Cast 
 Robert Ginty as Mac Riley
 Jeff McCracken as Andy Senkowski
 Tracy Scoggins as Irene Gorley
 Branscombe Richmond as Harker
 Mako Iwamatsu as Maj. Taro Oshira

Guest stars included Shelley Winters, Brianne Leary, Lorna Patterson, Donna Dixon,  Jennifer Holmes, Marta Dubois, Cindy Morgan, Moe Keale, James Sloyan, Fritz Weaver,  Tige Andrews,  Pat Corley, Manu Tupou, John Fujioka, David Hemmings, Peter Donat, and Charles Rocket.

Episodes

References

External links 
 
 Hawaiian Heat DVD Project
 Watch Hawaiian Heat episodes online

1984 American television series debuts
1984 American television series endings
American Broadcasting Company original programming
1980s American crime drama television series
English-language television shows
Television series by Universal Television
Television shows set in Hawaii
Television shows filmed in Hawaii
Fictional portrayals of the Honolulu Police Department